Pinakbet (also called pakbet or pinak bet) is an indigenous Filipino dish from the northern regions of the Philippines. Pinakbet is made from mixed vegetables sautéed in fish or shrimp sauce. The word is the contracted from the Ilokano word pinakebbet, meaning "shrunk" or "shriveled."  The original Ilocano pinakbet uses bagoong of fermented monamon or other fish, for seasoning sauce, while further south, bagoong alamang is used. The dish usually includes bitter melon (ampalaya). Other vegetables used include eggplant, tomato, okra, string beans, chili peppers, parda, winged beans, and others. Root crops and some beans like camote, patani, kadios are optionally added. The young pod of marunggay is added. It is usually spiced with ginger, onions, or garlic. A Tagalog version typically includes calabaza (kalabasa).

Most of these vegetables are easily accessible and are grown in backyards and gardens of most Ilocano households. As its name suggests, it is usually cooked until almost dry and shriveled; in the Tagalog version, the flavors of the vegetables are accentuated with shrimp paste. In some cases, lechon, chicharon, or other meats (most commonly pork) are added.

See also
 Dinengdeng — a term usually used by Ilocanos pertaining to any vegetable dish. Though different, dinengdeng is often used interchangeably with pinakbet. These two are different in cooking procedures and even in ingredients.

References

External links
 Various authentic, exotic, Ilokano pinakbets - a feature on the famous pinakbet dish of the Ilokanos, how and why the Ilokano people prepare and cook "original" pinakbet.

Philippine cuisine
Melon dishes
Ilocano cuisine